Rush is the debut studio album by Canadian rock band Rush. It was released on March 1, 1974 in Canada by Moon Records, the group's own label, before it was released internationally by Mercury Records later that year. Recorded five years after the band's formation, this first release shows much of the hard rock sound typical of many of the popular rock bands emerging earlier in the decade. Rush were fans of such bands as Led Zeppelin, Yes and Cream, and these influences can be heard in most of the songs on the album.

Original drummer John Rutsey performed all drum parts on the album, but was unable to go on extended tours because of complications with his diabetes and so he retired from the band after the album was released. Rutsey contributed to the album's lyrics, but never submitted the work to the other members of the band. The lyrics were instead entirely composed by vocalist/bassist Geddy Lee and guitarist Alex Lifeson. Rutsey was soon replaced by Neil Peart, who remained the band's drummer as well as primary lyricist.

Recording and production

Originally the recording sessions were produced by Dave Stock at Eastern Sound Studios in Toronto. They were scheduled late at night during the 'dead' time in studios because of the band's low budget and the rates during this period were the cheapest. Stock had also worked on the band's debut single (a cover of Buddy Holly's "Not Fade Away", with an original composition, "You Can't Fight It", on the B-side). "You Can't Fight It" was to be included on the album but was scrapped. Two of the Eastern Sound recordings, "In the Mood" and "Take a Friend" were included on the final album.

However, Rush were unhappy with the quality of the first sessions. They moved to Toronto Sound Studios and produced the next sessions themselves while achieving a significant improvement in recording quality. They added new overdubs to existing backing tracks of "What You're Doing", "Before and After" and "Working Man". The tracks with the most advanced production were recorded entirely at Toronto Sound: "Finding My Way", "Need Some Love" and "Here Again". These new songs took the place of recordings from the earlier sessions. Both studios used 8-channel multitrack recorders, which was quite primitive for 1973, but the group quickly learned to make the best use of the technology that was available.

In July 2008, Rush discovered an old version of "Working Man" with an alternative guitar solo. They allowed the makers of the popular rhythm game Rock Band to use the master tapes for the song's inclusion.

Distribution and release
The band and its management formed their own company, Moon Records, and released the album in Canada. Only 3,500 copies of the original Moon Records LP, catalogue number MN-100, were pressed. The first version of the LP has a cream-coloured label with a blue Moon Records logo and black type.

The album was soon picked up by WMMS, a radio station in Cleveland, Ohio. Donna Halper, a DJ working at the station, selected "Working Man" for her regular play list. Every time the song was played the station received phone calls asking where to buy the record. Copies of the Moon Records album were imported to the Cleveland area and quickly sold out. In the 2010 documentary film Rush: Beyond the Lighted Stage, Halper says that "Working Man" was the perfect song for the Cleveland rock audience, as it was still mostly a factory town in 1974. WMMS later sponsored one of Rush's first performances in the United States, in Cleveland on August 26, 1974.

The record's popularity in Cleveland quickly led to the re-release of the album by Mercury Records. The first Canadian Mercury release on the standard red Mercury label is nearly as rare as the Moon version. It also had the Moon number MN-100 between the run-out grooves, indicating that it was pressed from the same metal stampers as the Moon disc. "A special thank you to Donna Halper for getting the ball rolling" was added to the album credits of this and all later versions.

At this point manager Ray Danniels scraped together an additional $9,000 for producer Terry Brown to professionally re-mix all of the recordings for better sound quality. This remix version was used for later releases, most of which used the Mercury "skyline" record label instead of the red label. A later Moon Records version of undetermined origin has a pink label with grey moon craters.

The original album logo was red, but a printing error made it appear more magenta in colour. This is one of two Rush albums where the cover artwork had printing errors, the other album being Caress of Steel.

The complete album, along with Fly by Night and Caress of Steel, was included as part of the 1978 Anthem release Archives.

Critical reception

Rush received positive reviews upon its 1974 release. Writing for the Ottawa Citizen, Bill Provick gave praise on the band's "immediate acceleration" and "driving, crisp sound", although he felt that "the energy needs a bit more channeling and the arrangements need a touch more refining". Billboard wrote that it "serves up a dose of good hard rock highlighted by the often Robert Plant-like lead vocals of Geddy Lee and the powerful guitar work of Alex Lifeson and solid drumming from John Rutsey."

However, critical reception in later years has been more negative. Greg Prato of AllMusic stated in his review of the album that it was weaker than some of the band's later works, such as Hemispheres and Moving Pictures, because Neil Peart was not yet a part of the band. He finished his review by saying, "While longtime Rush fans can appreciate their debut because they never returned to this style, newcomers should stick with their classics from later years."

Remaster
A remaster was issued in 1997.
 The tray has a picture of the star with man painting (mirroring the cover art of Retrospective I) with "The Rush Remasters" printed in all capital letters just to the left. All remasters from Rush through Permanent Waves are like this.

Rush was remastered again in 2011 by Andy VanDette for the "Sector" box sets, which re-released all of Rush's Mercury-era albums. The album is included in the Sector 1 set.

The album was remastered and re-released on vinyl in April 2014 as part of a box set to celebrate its 40th Anniversary. The 2014 vinyl version included a replica of the original Moon Records label on the LP.

Rush was remastered for vinyl in 2015 as a part of the official "12 Months of Rush" promotion. The high definition master prepared for this release was also made available for purchase in 24-bit/96 kHz and 24-bit/192 kHz formats, at several high-resolution audio online music stores. These masters have significantly less dynamic range compression than the 1997 remasters and the "Sector" remasters by Andy VanDette.

Track listing

Personnel

Rush 
Geddy Lee – lead vocals, bass
Alex Lifeson – lead guitar, backing vocals
John Rutsey – drums, percussion, backing vocals

Production 
Terry Brown – engineer, remixing
Paul Weldon – album cover
Ian Grandy – road crew
Liam Birt – road crew
BIC Photography – photography
SRO Productions – executive production

Release history

Charts

Certifications

References

Citations

Sources

External links
 

Rush (band) albums
1974 debut albums
Anthem Records albums
Mercury Records albums